Bowling Green Township may refer to:
 Bowling Green Township, Fayette County, Illinois
 Bowling Green Township, Chariton County, Missouri
 Bowling Green Township, Pettis County, Missouri
 Bowling Green Township, Licking County, Ohio
 Bowling Green Township, Marion County, Ohio

Township name disambiguation pages